Oberfucking is a populated place in Upper Austria, Austria.

It is a part of the town St. Marienkirchen in district Schärding, near the border to Germany.  Oberfucking has 38 inhabitants (by January 2020).

Oberfucking has often been included in lists of places with unusual names.

See also
Fugging, Upper Austria
Unterfucking
Sankt Marienkirchen bei Schärding
Shitterton

References

Cities and towns in Schärding District